Continental Airport Express is a private shuttle van and bus service operating between Chicago's O'Hare International Airport, Chicago's Loop and various Chicago city and suburban hotels. Continental Airport Express is a successor company to the Parmalee Transfer Company, which was founded in 1853, and moved passengers and baggage between Chicago's six downtown railroad terminals.

External links
Continental Airport Express web page

Transportation in Chicago
Companies based in Chicago
Transportation companies of the United States
Transportation companies based in Illinois